Kacem Bouallouche (born 20 September 1963) is a Moroccan wrestler. He competed in the men's Greco-Roman 57 kg at the 1988 Summer Olympics.

References

External links
 

1963 births
Living people
Moroccan male sport wrestlers
Olympic wrestlers of Morocco
Wrestlers at the 1988 Summer Olympics
Place of birth missing (living people)